The eleventh season of South Park, an American animated television series created by Trey Parker and Matt Stone, began airing on March 7, 2007. The 11th season concluded after 14 episodes on November 14, 2007. 
This is the first season to have uncensored episodes available for DVD release. This is also the season featuring the three-part, Emmy Award-winning episode "Imaginationland" (which was released separately on DVD with scenes not shown in the televised version before being packaged with the rest of the season 11 episodes as part of the complete season DVD). Parker was the director and writer of this eleventh season. Imaginationland: The Movie was released in 2008, which compiled the three episodes into a standalone film.

Episodes

References

External links

 South Park Studios - official website with streaming video of full episodes.
 The Comedy Network - full episodes for Canada

 
2007 American television seasons